Myzaphis is a genus of true bugs belonging to the family Aphididae.

The species of this genus are found in Europe and Northern America.

Species:
 Myzaphis bucktoni Jacob, 1946 
 Myzaphis juchnevitschae Kadyrbekov, 1993

References

Aphididae